Keravnos Perni Football Club is a Greek football club, based in Perni, Kavala, Greece.

Honours

Domestic

 Kavala FCA Champions: 2
 2013–14, 2017–18
 Kavala FCA Cup Winners: 1
 2016–17

References

Football clubs in Eastern Macedonia and Thrace
Kavala
Association football clubs established in 1977
1977 establishments in Greece
Gamma Ethniki clubs